The Ausfod was an automobile manufactured by the Ausfod Motor Engineering Co Ltd in Chorlton-on-Medlock, Manchester from 1947 to 1948. It was one of the few trials specials which was offered for sale to the public. It used a Ford Model C Ten engine, Austin Seven chassis, LMB trials  front axle, and a remote control gearbox. 

An aerodynamic sports car was advertised along with the trials car, but it is not clear as to whether any were made.

See also
 List of car manufacturers of the United Kingdom

References
"Ausfod", in G.N. Georgano, ed., The Complete Encyclopedia of Motorcars 1885-1968  (New York: E.P. Dutton and Co., 1974).

Defunct motor vehicle manufacturers of the United Kingdom